Cathetopteron amoena is a species of beetle in the family Cerambycidae, and the only species in the genus Cathetopteron. It was described by Hamilton in 1896.

References

Hemilophini
Beetles described in 1896